The 190th Street station (originally 190th Street–Overlook Terrace) is a station on the IND Eighth Avenue Line of the New York City Subway, served by the A train at all times. It is located on Fort Washington Avenue in the Hudson Heights section of Manhattan's Washington Heights neighborhood, near the avenue's intersection with Cabrini Boulevard at Margaret Corbin Circle, about three blocks north of 190th Street.

The 190th Street station opened in 1932 and has two tracks and two side platforms. It is close to Fort Tryon Park with the Cloisters medieval art museum, and the Mother Cabrini Shrine. An additional exit through the side of the hill leads to Bennett Avenue and provides access to the Broadway Valley area of Washington Heights. The station is listed on the National Register of Historic Places.

History 

The New York City Board of Transportation began constructing a station at 190th Street in 1928 as part of a subway expansion. Squire J. Vickers, the chief architect of the Dual System, helped design the 190th Street station. He was responsible for most stations on the Independent Subway System (IND), and being a painter, he did tile work for the station. Robert Ridgway was hired as the chief engineer.

The station opened on September 10, 1932, as part of the city-operated IND's initial segment, the Eighth Avenue Line between Chambers Street and 207th Street. Construction of the whole line cost $191.2 million. Service at this station was provided with express service from its onset. While the IRT Broadway–Seventh Avenue Line already provided service to Washington Heights, the new subway via Fort Washington Avenue made subway service more readily accessible. Its opening resulted in the development of residential apartment buildings south of the station.

On December 28, 1950, the Board of Transportation issued a report concerning the construction of bomb shelters in the subway system. Five deep stations in Washington Heights, including the 190th Street station, were considered to be ideal for being used as bomb-proof shelters. The program was expected to cost $104 million. These shelters were expected to provide limited protection against conventional bombs, while providing protection against shock waves and air blast, as well as from the heat and radiation from an atomic bomb. To become suitable as shelters, the stations would require water-supply facilities, first-aid rooms, and additional bathrooms. However, the program, which required federal funding, was never completed.

In 1951, researchers from New York University concluded that in the event of a nuclear attack, the 190th Street station would provide adequate shelter from fallout. This was ascertained after the researchers conducted tests on cosmic rays inside deep subway stations in the area.

The 190th Street station is mostly unchanged from its original design. On March 30, 2005, the 190th Street station was listed on the National Register of Historic Places. The station was considered historically and architecturally significant as an early IND station that retained many of its original features.

Elevator modifications
From 1932 until 1957, pedestrians had to pay a fare to use the elevators. Though the elevators were intended for subway riders, local residents paid the subway fare to avoid climbing about eight stories up Fort Washington Hill.  Bills were proposed in the New York State Legislature to put the elevators out of fare control, but these failed in committee. On September 5, 1957, the New York City Transit Authority (NYCTA) began allowing free public access to the elevators at the 181st and 190th Street stations. The NYCTA agreed once Joseph Zaretzki, the local State Senator, requested the change.

In July 2003, to reduce costs, the Metropolitan Transportation Authority (MTA) announced that as part of its 2004 budget it would eliminate 22 elevator operator positions at this station and four others in Washington Heights, leaving one full-time operator per station. The agency had intended removing all the attendants at these stops, but kept one in each station after many riders protested. The change took effect on January 20, 2004, and saved $1.2 million a year. In November 2007, the MTA proposed savings cuts to help reduce the agency's deficit. As part of the plan, all elevator operators at 190th Street, along with those in four other stations in Washington Heights, would have been cut. MTA employees had joined riders in worrying about an increase in crime as a result of the cuts after an elevator operator at 181st Street on the Broadway–Seventh Avenue Line helped save a stabbed passenger. The move was intended to save $1.7 million a year. However, on December 7, 2007, the MTA announced that it would not remove the remaining elevator operators at these stations, due to pushback from elected officials and residents from the area. In October 2018, the MTA once again proposed removing the elevator operators at the five stations, but this decision was reversed after dissent from the Transport Workers' Union.

The elevator attendants serve as a way to reassure passengers as the elevators are the only entrance to the platforms, and passengers often wait for the elevators with an attendant. The attendants at the five stations are primarily maintenance and cleaning workers who have had injuries that made it hard for them to continue doing their original jobs.

This station's elevators were closed for elevator replacement on August 29, 2020, but the station remained open via the exit to Bennett Avenue. The elevators were scheduled to reopen in September 2021, but only some were reopened on November 30, 2021; the reopening was pushed back due to unexpected structural issues.

Station layout

The station has two tracks and two side platforms. It is the third-to-last station on the IND Eighth Avenue Line proceeding northbound. The platform level contains a double-barrel-vaulted ceiling supported by an arcade in the center. The ceiling is relatively low, in contrast to other nearby deep-level stations such as 181st Street or 168th Street stations on the IRT Broadway–Seventh Avenue Line, where the vaults are larger.

The outer walls of the platform level consist of tiled alcoves, slightly recessed within concrete arches.  The station's tiles are colored maroon to help riders identify their station more easily, part of a color-coded tile system for the entire Independent Subway System. Maroon-and-black plaques with white sans-serif lettering reading "190-OVERLOOK TER." are located on the walls nearest the stairways to the mezzanine. Smaller maroon, black, and white mosaics with the number "190" are located within some of the alcoves. Within the alcoves that do not contain the "190" mosaic, there are black tiles with white numerals reading "190". The remaining tiling in the alcoves is white. A ramp leads from the northbound platform to an exit passageway leading to Bennett Avenue.

A small concrete-floored mezzanine is located above the platforms toward the northern end of the station. The portion of the mezzanine above the platforms has metal railings on its northern and southern sides, from which the platforms can be seen. The rest of the mezzanine has white tiled walls. Two stairs descend from the mezzanine to each platform. There is also a station-agent booth on the northern wall.

Although this is an extremely deep station, the Bennett Avenue entrance is at a lower elevation than the platforms, so the ramp slopes down. Additionally, Dyckman Street, the next station north, is only one level below the surface, in contrast to the 190th Street station.

Entrances and exits
Contrary to the station's name, there are no exits to either 190th Street or Overlook Terrace. However, the station has entrances both to Hudson Heights, on top of the ridge, and to Bennett Avenue in the valley of Washington Heights, on the bottom.

A tunnel leading eastward from the station provides access to Bennett Avenue, midblock between Broadway and 192nd Street, with an entrance built right into the rock face. The 207th Street-bound platform contains an exit-only (one turnstile and one gate) ramp that bypasses fare control and leads to the passageway to the Bennett Avenue entrance. Passengers used to be able to enter the station from the ramp, which is evidenced by tiled mosaics.

The entrance at the top of the ridge is a head house located at the end of Fort Washington Avenue, at Margaret Corbin Circle. The station was built while the Cloisters in Fort Tryon Park were under construction, making it possible for the head house to have a stone facade to harmonize it with the entrance to the Cloisters several hundred feet north of the station's entrance. The head house is a single-story rectangular stone building with a black hip roof. The longer sides are on the western and eastern elevations, and each contain three bays. The northern elevation contains three small arches, of which the center arch contained a doorway into the head house. The southern elevation is abutted by stone stairs leading down to the station's elevators and a play area within Fort Tryon Park. A lamppost and a steel sign with the word "SUBWAY" is located on the sidewalk of Fort Washington Avenue at the top of these stairs.

Elevators 
The station maintains three elevators from the mezzanine in one tower at its eastern end, and has done so since its opening. The elevators lead upward to the basement of the Fort Washington Avenue head house. The head house basement contains brick walls and a concrete floor and ceiling, and formerly contained a token booth. The elevators were formerly only open during the daytime, and required the payment of a fare to use since the fare control for both street entrances to the station was originally located just inside the street doors. Since 1957, the elevators have been available for use by pedestrians going between Bennett Avenue and Fort Washington Avenue without paying a fare; a similar situation exists at 181st Street, the next station downtown, as well as at 191st Street, on the IRT Broadway–Seventh Avenue Line. The elevators to the mezzanine still utilize elevator operators, one of the few stations in the system to do so.

The station is not compliant with the Americans with Disabilities Act of 1990, and thus cannot be used by passengers with wheelchairs, because access from the fare control area to the platforms is only possible via stairways. Additionally, the elevators as well as the free out-of-system traverse between Fort Washington and Bennett Avenues are not ADA-compliant for wheelchair users either (unlike at 181st Street), since the entrance to the former is only accessible by several flights of stairs, and another smaller staircase exists between the end of the passageway and the Bennett Avenue exit. There is a staircase available in case of an emergency.

Notes

References

External links 

 
 Station Reporter — A Lefferts
 Station Reporter — A Rockaway
 The Subway Nut — 190th Street
 Fort Washington Avenue entrance from Google Maps Street View
 Bennett Avenue entrance from Google Maps Street View
 Platform from Google Maps Street View

1932 establishments in New York City
IND Eighth Avenue Line stations
New York City Subway stations in Manhattan
Railway and subway stations on the National Register of Historic Places in Manhattan
Railway stations in the United States opened in 1932
Washington Heights, Manhattan